Mark West is an unincorporated community immediately north of Santa Rosa, California  in Sonoma County, California,  United States.  Mark West is located along Mark West Springs Road adjacent to U.S. Highway 101.  The community of Mark West is named for Scottish American pioneer William Marcus West.

After the San Francisco and North Pacific Railroad was extended to Cloverdale in the 1870s, its trains stopped in Mark West.

See also
 Larkfield-Wikiup, California
 Mark West Creek
 Mark West Springs
 Northwestern Pacific Railroad

References

Unincorporated communities in California
Unincorporated communities in Sonoma County, California